The Avenue de Malakoff is a street in the 16th arrondissement of Paris. It was given its present name in 1854, the year in which French troops captured the Malakhov Tower during the Crimean War, leading to the subsequent capture of nearby Sevastopol the following year.

410 metres long and 23.5 metres wide, it begins at the avenue Foch and ends at a junction with boulevard de l'Amiral-Bruix and the avenue de la Grande-Armée. It formerly began at place du Trocadéro but in 1936 the section between place du Trocadéro and avenue Foch was renamed avenue Raymond-Poincaré.

In the street was the théâtre Malakoff, little theatrical venue at the beginning of the XXe century.

16th arrondissement of Paris